The Armed Forces (Pensions and Compensation) Act 2004 (c 32) is an Act of the Parliament of the United Kingdom.

Section 7 - Amendments and repeals
Section 7(2) was repealed by paragraph 228(l) of Schedule 3 to the Transfer of Tribunal Functions Order 2008 (S.I. 2008/2833)

Section 8 - Commencement
The following orders have been made under this section:
Armed Forces (Pensions and Compensation) Act 2004 (Commencement No. 1) Order 2005 (S.I. 2005/116 (C. 4))
The Armed Forces (Pensions and Compensation) Act 2004 (Commencement No. 2) Order 2005 (S.I. 2005/356 (C. 13))
The Armed Forces (Pensions and Compensation) Act 2004 (Commencement No. 3) Order 2005 (S.I. 2005/3107 (C. 133))

Schedule 1 - Amendments to Pensions Appeal Tribunals Act 1943
Paragraphs 8 and 9 were repealed on 3 April 2006 by section 146 of, and Part 2 of Schedule 18 to, the Constitutional Reform Act 2005.

See also
Armed Forces Act

References
Halsbury's Statutes,

External links
The Armed Forces (Pensions and Compensation) Act 2004, as amended from the National Archives.
The Armed Forces (Pensions and Compensation) Act 2004, as originally enacted from the National Archives.

United Kingdom Acts of Parliament 2004